not to be confused with Sograndio, Oviedo, also in Asturias

Sograndio is one of eight parishes in Proaza, a municipality within the province and autonomous community of Asturias, in northern Spain.

The postal code is 33114.

See also
 Iglesia de San Esteban (Sograndio)

References

Parishes in Proaza